The Forty-seventh Amendment of the Constitution of India, officially known as The Constitution (Forty-seventh Amendment) Act, 1984, amended the Ninth Schedule to the Constitution, and added 14 legislations relating to land reforms, enacted by the States of Assam, Bihar, Haryana, Tamil Nadu, Uttar Pradesh and West Bengal and the union territory of Goa, Daman and Diu with a view to provide that the enactments shall not be deemed to be void on the ground that they are inconsistent with any of the provisions of Part III of the Constitution relating to Fundamental Rights.

Text

Proposal and enactment
The Constitution (Forty-seventh Amendment) Act, 1984 was introduced in the Lok Sabha on 19 August 1983 as the Constitution (Forty-eighth Amendment) Bill, 1983 (Bill No. 94 of 1983). It was introduced by Harinatha Misra, then Minister of State in the Ministry of Rural Development. The Bill sought to add to the Ninth Schedule to the Constitution, 14 additional legislations relating to land reforms, enacted by the States of Assam, Bihar, Haryana, Tamil Nadu, Uttar Pradesh and West Bengal and the Union territory of Goa, Daman and Diu with a view to provide that the enactments shall not be deemed to be void on the ground that they are inconsistent with any of the provisions of Part III of the Constitution relating to Fundamental Rights. The full text of the Statement of Objects and Reasons appended to the bill is given below:

The Bill was considered by the Lok Sabha on 22 and 23 August and passed on 23 August 1984, with formal amendments changing the short title to the Constitution (Forty-seventh Amendment) Act, 1984 and replacing the word "Thirty-fourth" by the word "Thirty-fifth" in the Enacting Formula. The Bill, as passed by the Lok Sabha, was considered and passed by the Rajya Sabha on 25 August 1984. The bill received assent from then President Giani Zail Singh on 26 August 1984. It was notified in The Gazette of India, and came into effect on the same date.

See also
List of amendments of the Constitution of India

References

47
1983 in law
1984 in law
1984 in India
Indira Gandhi administration